Julian Bamberger (1899–1967) was an American politician.

Julian Bamberger was born to German emigrant Simon Bamberger in Salt Lake City on 9 February 1899. Julian graduated from Princeton University in 1910, pursued postgraduate studies in electrical engineering, and returned to Utah. He became president of the Bamberger Railway Company, oversaw gold and copper mines in Nevada, and took over the Lagoon amusement park, founded by his father Simon in 1896. Julian Bamberger served in the Utah Senate from 1932 to 1936, as a Democrat. He died in Salt Lake City of a heart condition in 1967.

References

1967 deaths
20th-century American businesspeople
American mining businesspeople
American people of German descent
1899 births
Democratic Party Utah state senators
20th-century American politicians
Businesspeople from Salt Lake City
American railroad executives
Princeton University alumni